Anna Kuczera (born Borowska) (born 4 July 1994) is a Polish judoka.

She is the gold medallist of the 2017 Judo Grand Prix Tashkent in the -57 kg category.

References

External links
 

1994 births
Living people
Polish female judoka
21st-century Polish women